Feets, Don't Fail Me Now is an album by Herbie Hancock

It or similar phrases may also refer to:

 Feet Don't Fail Me Now video by Switchfoot  
 Feet Don't Fail Me Now, a song by Utopia from their eponymous album
 Feats Don't Fail Me Now by Little Feat
 My Feet Can't Fail Me Now, an album by Dirty Dozen Brass Band
 Feet, Don't Fail Me Now, a song by Needtobreathe from Rivers in the Wasteland
 Feet Don't Fail Me Now, a song by Foxes from All I Need
 Feet Don't Fail Me Now, by Joy Crookes
 "Feet Don't Fail Me", a song by Queens of the Stone Age from Villains